Trichromia klagesi is a moth in the subfamily Arctiinae. It was described by Rothschild in 1909. It is found in French Guiana, Guyana and Brazil.

Subspecies
Trichromia klagesi klagesi
Trichromia klagesi salmonea (Rothschild, 1935) (Guyana)

References

Moths described in 1909
klagesi